is a Japanese long-distance runner. In 2019, he competed in the senior men's race at the 2019 IAAF World Cross Country Championships held in Aarhus, Denmark. He finished in 65th place.

In 2020, he won the gold medal in the men's 5000 metres event at the 2020 Japan Championships in Athletics held in Niigata, Japan.

References

External links 
 

Living people
1996 births
Place of birth missing (living people)
Japanese male long-distance runners
Japanese male cross country runners
Japan Championships in Athletics winners
Athletes (track and field) at the 2020 Summer Olympics
Olympic athletes of Japan
20th-century Japanese people
21st-century Japanese people